André Génovès (1941 in Paris –  1 February 2012 in Thoiry) was a  French film producer and director.

Filmography 
 1968: Les Biches
 1969: This Man Must Die
 1969: The Unfaithful Wife
 1970: Le Boucher
 1970: The Breach
 1971: Just Before Nightfall
 1973: Wedding in Blood
 1974: Nada
 1975: Innocents with Dirty Hands
 1976: Barocco
 1976: Mado
 1976: A Real Young Girl
 1976:  (Néa)
 1984: Mesrine

References

External links 
 André Génovès on Ciné-Ressources
 
 25 films linked to André Génovès on Ciné-ressources.net

1941 births
2012 deaths
Film directors from Paris
French film producers